Antonio Marcegaglia (born in Mantua on 12 December 1963) is an Italian managing director, Chairman and CEO of Marcegaglia.

Biography
Antonio Marcegaglia obtained an honours degree in business studies from Milan's Luigi Bocconi University in 1987 and joined the Marcegaglia full-time a few days later. He forged an indissoluble bond between his personal career and the growth of this fine mid-sized Italian company of those days, later transforming it into today's major global player.

Led by Antonio Marcegaglia, the diversification of the group was then extended with the establishment of Bioindustrie Mantovane and the acquisition of Oskar of Osteria Grande (Bologna), Nuova Omec, Ennepi of Lugo di Romagna (Ravenna) and Imat of Fontanafredda (Pordenone) in 1988 and of CCT of Gallarate (Varese) and Elet.Ca of Capalle (Florence) in 1989, as well as the foundation in 1989 of Marcegaglia Impianti of Saronno (Varese).  In the same year, Marcegaglia acquired holdings in Fergallo of Motteggiana (Mantua), SIM of Sant'Atto (Teramo) and Elletre of Montebello Vicentino (Vicenza). In 1991 the Group acquired Resco Tubi of Cusago (Milan) and OMF of Fiume Veneto (Pordenone). In 1994 it acquired Brollo Profilati of Desio (Milan), later moved to the “former Breda” area just outside Milan, on a site totalling 8 hectares purchased in 1996, and then in 1995 ETA Euro Tubi Acciaio of Milan, followed by a stake in Allu's of Sesto al Reghena (Pordenone).

The new business and production constellation enabled the group to have a presence also in the sectors of metal household items, electrostatic paint for metals and metal components for the electrical appliance industry. Meanwhile, its metallurgical sector grew with the production of fine stainless steel tubes and cold-rolled profiles.

In 1996, the Euro Energy Group was also established in order to create plants for the production of energy from renewable sources. In January 1997 Nuova Forsidera Spa, specialising in steel cold rolling and galvanising processes, was acquired with its plants in Corsico (Milan) and Albignasego (Padua).

The group's energy division was expanded in 1997 under the guidance of Antonio Marcegaglia with the establishment of Green Power, for the development of strategies and systems for energy generation through the gasification of waste and biomass. Further expansion came in 1998, with the creation of Boiler Expertise to design and construct the industrial and power boilers.

In that same year came the acquisition of Astra of Mezzolara, Budrio (Bologna), and the Siderplating establishment was also acquired, under the name of Marcegaglia San Giorgio of Nogaro (Udine), producing rolling mill plates.

Antonio Marcegaglia's corporate development programme continued in 1999 with the acquisition of Morteo Nord of Pozzolo Formigaro (Alessandria), and Ponteggi Dalmine of Milan, Graffignana (Lodi) and Potenza.

This was followed in 2001 by the acquisition, in the tourism sector, of the holiday resort of Pugnochiuso, situated on the Gargano promontory in Apulia.

In December 2001, following an investment of over 500 million euros over very few years, a large new centre of production was opened in Ravenna, the second largest iron and steel centre in Italy. And in 2002, in the former Belleli area in Taranto, its second largest production plant in the South, after the one in Potenza, entered into operation

In 2003, the sector of products for the household electrical appliance industry expanded further with the acquisition of BVB of San Lorenzo in Campo (Pesaro). While in 2004 the group took a fundamental step in the development of its activities in the tourism sector by acquiring, with Banca Intesa and the Ifil group, 49% of Sviluppo Italia Turismo

In 2007 Antonio Marcegaglia acquired the stake in Gabetti Property Solutions and upgraded the Ravenna plant with a further investment of 300 million euros. The Group continued its expansion in the energy sector where, with its subsidiary Arendi, began production of photovoltaic panels.  Likewise, its presence in tourism grew further with the acquisition of the management of Forte Village of Santa Margherita di Pula, in Sardinia, the largest hotel complex in Italy and Europe. This was followed soon after by the “Le Tonnare” holiday resort in Stintino, in the province of Sassari. In 2007 the production plant at Boltiere (Bergamo) was also enlarged. In 2008 the Group acquired the holiday location at Castel Monastero di Castelnuovo Berardenga (Siena) and the "Former Arsenale" property complex at La Maddalena (Sassari).

Since 2017, following the assignment of the Ilva Group to AM Investco (the joint-venture consisting of ArcelorMittal and Marcegaglia), Antonio Marcegaglia has been promoting the relaunch of this great European steelworks asset. The objective is to strengthen its position as a market leader and to increase the company's market share in the European and World iron and steel works industry.

Internationalisation of the Group 
In 1989, Antonio Marcegaglia launched the Marcegaglia Group's internationalisation policy which has strengthened its direct presence in the international markets.

Marcegaglia Deutschland of Düsseldorf was established in 1989 for the distribution of the Group's own products on the German market and in Scandinavia.  United Stainless Steel was also created in the UK near London, followed by Marcegaglia U.K., for the production of welded tubes from hot and cold rolled strip, and then by Marcegaglia UK at Dudley, West Midlands.

In 1991 Antonio Marcegaglia launched the project which would see the group enter into the transatlantic markets. In the second half of the year The New Bishop Tube of Philadelphia was acquired in the US, and, in February 1992, Damascus of Greenville. Two major production units which then led to the creation of Damascus-Bishop Tube Company, specialising in the production of stainless steel.

In 1993 Antonio Marcegaglia acquired the Belgian Cotubel group, a distributor of stainless steel products and tubes in France and Benelux, and founded the trading company Central Bright Steel for the distribution of welded tubes in the UK; it also began production of these same products near Birmingham in 1997.

In the summer of 1998, a large industrial area in Munhall, near Pittsburgh, was acquired to accommodate the new Marcegaglia USA, which would also incorporate the Damascus-Bishop Tube Company.

During the same period, two other companies were formed in the United States, as subsidiaries of the parent companies in Italy: Oskar Usa in Birmingham (Alabama) and Oto Mills Usa in Wheaton (Illinois).

In 1999 Antonio Marcegaglia's efforts led to the incorporation of Marcegaglia Iberica, Marcegaglia Ireland, Marcegaglia France, Marcegaglia Austria and Marcegaglia do Brasil, the latter tripling its turnover by 2005, extending its plant and taking the number of its employees to 1000. Meanwhile, in Bremen, in joint venture with the Arbed Group, the first Marcegaglia company to produce quality steel was formed.

In 2000, the Group acquired Earcanal of Leioa, Spain. Following the joint venture with Arbed, in 2004 the Marcegaglia Group signed an agreement with the Corus group for the 10-year co-management of its British steelworks on Teesside, guaranteeing the supply at cost price of one million tonnes per year of slabs for the production of coils and sheets. Oto Mills do Brasil was founded in San Paolo in the same year.

In 2005 the Group proceeded with the expansion of Marcegaglia do Brasil, and in June Antonio Marcegaglia opened its fourth overseas production plant in Praszka (Poland), to manufacture tubes for refrigeration, panels and corrugated steel sheets. One year later, 20 kilometres away, the plant at Kluczbork was added, for the production of tubes and drawn products. Marcegaglia established Marcegaglia Gulf at Doha, Qatar in 2007. The expansion of its industrial activities continued in 2008 with its entry into China, where, in Yangzhou, 350 km north-west of Shanghai, it created its first Asian plant for the production of stainless steel tubes and high-precision carbon steel, with the establishment of Marcegaglia Romania at Cluj, and with the start of work on the new production plant at Vladimir, Russia.

In October 2013, following the passing of his father Steno, founder of the group, Antonio Marcegaglia is appointed Chairman of Marcegaglia group.

Ordinance
Antonio Marcegaglia has been awarded Stainless Steel Executive of the Year 2010 at 9th Stainless & Special Steel Summit in Rome

Notes

External links
 Marcegaglia
 Marcegaglia
 Francisville
 Convention di Federacciai 2008
 Convention di Federacciai 2006
 Marcegaglia apre altri stabilimenti e assume
 Collezione MarcegagliaSteellife
 18° Steel Market Outlook
 Operazione sui mercati esteri affidata da Steno al figlio Antonio Marcegaglia
 Opere d'arte contemporanea esposte in Bocconi
 CONVEGNO ASSOFERMET
 PREMIO 'IMPRENDITORE NEL MONDO'
 Marcegaglia set to expand operations in Qatar
 SteelLife alla Triennale di Milano
 Intervista ad Antonio Marcegaglia - Sole 24 ore
 Antonio Marcegaglia Paving the road to success  - STAHL MARKT European Edition
 Marcegaglia relaunches PV
 Antonio Marcegaglia a "Il Sole 24 Ore"
 22° Steel Market Outlook - Siderweb.com
 Inaugurazione Impianto Fotovoltaico, Marcegaglia Taranto  - La Gazzetta del Mezzogiorno.it
 Antonio Marcegaglia: "Diversificazione e flessibilità i capisaldi del futuro"  - SteelOrbis
 Marcegaglia sfida la Cina in casa - La Gazzetta di Mantova
 Marcegaglia approda in Cina - AgiChina24
 Marcegaglia approda in Cina - Il Sole24ore
 Il gruppo Marcegaglia in Cina - Radio24

1963 births
Living people
Businesspeople from Mantua